Aspartimas is a genus of flies in the family Stratiomyidae.

Species
Aspartimas formosanus (Enderlein, 1921)

References

Stratiomyidae
Brachycera genera
Diptera of South America